Preston Brady Delano (April 2, 1886 – August 31, 1961) was a United States Comptroller of the Currency from October, 1938 to 1953. He inherited this Office from an Acting Comptroller of the Currency from April 1938 to September 1938 named Marshall R. Diggs.

He graduated from Stanford University in 1909.

Preston Delano held office for 14 years, the longest term of any Comptroller. Delano was a businessman, investment counselor, and served as governor of the Home Loan Bank Board when appointed Comptroller by President Franklin D. Roosevelt.

He was responsible for preserving and stabilizing the national banks during the Second World War,  which vastly increased the volume of money needed for war expenditures, subsequently causing government debt to rise substantially. Delano entered retirement after his resignation.

Personal life
Delano was the son of Moses Abbott Delano (1848-1930) and his wife, Ellen Verneo (nee Bennett) Delano (1848-1926). He was born in Phoenix, Michigan, but by the time of the 1900 United States Census the family was living in Fairhaven, Massachusetts, his father's birthplace; his Delano line had long lived in Fairhaven. On May 24, 1922 in Portland, Oregon, he married Ruth Small (April 29, 1891-February 19, 1973). 

Delano was a "distant cousin" of President Roosevelt, and part of the extended Delano family. They are 5th cousins to be exact, sharing the same pair of 4th great-grandparents Jonathan Delano (1647-1720) and Mercy (Warren) Delano (1657-1728). Another relative is his fourth cousin, once removed Columbus Delano, a United States Congressman from Ohio;

References

Preston Delano's obituary at the New York Times

External links 
 Collection of Preston Delano's works

1886 births
1961 deaths
United States Comptrollers of the Currency
Comptrollers in the United States
Delano family
Chairs of the Federal Deposit Insurance Corporation
Franklin D. Roosevelt administration personnel
Truman administration personnel
Eisenhower administration personnel